Tabernacle Baptist Church is a historic Baptist church located at Utica in Oneida County, New York.  It was built in 1867, and is a cruciform plan, Gothic Revival style, red sandstone church.  It features a multi-staged corner tower with a square base and corner buttresses.  Attached to the rear of the church is the brick Thorn Chapel and school added in 1905.

It was listed on the National Register of Historic Places in 2012.

See also
 National Register of Historic Places listings in Oneida County, New York

References

Baptist churches in New York (state)
19th-century Baptist churches in the United States
Churches on the National Register of Historic Places in New York (state)
Gothic Revival church buildings in New York (state)
Churches completed in 1867
Churches in Oneida County, New York
National Register of Historic Places in Oneida County, New York